Richard B. Gaffin, Jr. is a Calvinist theologian, Presbyterian minister, and was the Charles Krahe Professor of Biblical and Systematic Theology at Westminster Theological Seminary in Philadelphia, Pennsylvania from 1999 to 2008. He became the Professor Emeritus, Biblical and Systematic Theology in 2008.

Biography

Gaffin was born in 1936 to missionaries in China. His father, Richard B. Gaffin, Sr. (1907-1996) was one of the founders of the Reformed Presbyterian Church in Taiwan and was also the very first person who introduced confessional reformed faith to the people in Taiwan.

Gaffin, Jr. received a B.A. from Calvin College (1958), a B.D. (1961), Th.M. (1962), and Th.D. (1969) from Westminster Theological Seminary, and undertook graduate studies at University of Göttingen (1962-1963). He has taught at Westminster since 1965. He was the leading defender of then fellow-faculty member Norman Shepherd during the controversy over the doctrine of justification that took place at Westminster Theological Seminary from 1975 to 1982. He is an ordained minister in the Orthodox Presbyterian Church.

Publications
Gaffin is the author of books including: 
 Resurrection and Redemption: A study in Paul's Soteriology, 2nd edition (P&R, 1987),
 Perspectives on Pentecost: New Testament Teaching on the Gifts of the Holy Spirit (P&R, 1993), 
 God's Word in Servant-Form: Abraham Kuyper and Herman Bavinck and the Doctrine of Scripture (Reformed Academic Press, 2008)(),
 No Adam, No Gospel: Adam and the History of Redemption, (P&R, 2015),
 Calvin and the Sabbath: The Controversy of Applying the Fourth Commandment, revised edition (Mentor, 2009)
 By Faith, Not By Sight: Paul and the Order of Salvation, 2nd edition (P&R, 2013), and
 In The Fullness of Time: An Introduction to the Biblical Theology of Acts and Paul, (Crossway, 2022) (ISBN 978-1433563348).

He has contributed to or edited several volumes, including:
 "Geerhardus Vos and the Interpretation of Paul,"in Jerusalem and Athens, edited by E. R. Geehan (P&R, 1980) (a Festschrift for Cornelius Van Til),
 "Theonomy and Eschatology Some Reflections on Postmillennialism," in Theonomy: A Reformed Critique, edited by William S. Barker and W. Robert Godfrey (Zondervan, 1990),
 "A Cessationist View," in Are Miraculous Gifts for Today? edited by Wayne Grudem (Zondervan, 1996),
 "Union with Christ: Some Biblical and Theological Reflections," in Always Reforming: Explorations in Systematic Theology, edited by A. T. B. McGowan (IVP Academic, 2007),
 "What “Symphony of Sighs”? Reflections on the Eschatological Future of the Creation," in Redeeming the Life of the Mind: Essays in Honor of Vern Poythress, edited by John M. Frame, Wayne Grudem, John J. Hughes (Crossway, 2017),

 Herman Nicolaas Ridderbos, Redemptive History and the New Testament Scriptures, revised edition, edited by Richard B. Gaffin Jr. (P&R, 1988), 
 Redemptive History and Biblical Interpretation: The Shorter Writings of Geerhardus Vos, edited by Richard B. Gaffin Jr. (P&R, 2001),
 J.P. Versteeg, Adam in the New Testament: Mere Teaching Model or First Historical Man? edited by Richard B. Gaffin Jr. (P&R, 2012),
 Thy Word Is Still Truth: Essential Writings on the Doctrine of Scripture from the Reformation to Today, edited by Richard B. Gaffin Jr., Peter A. Lillback (P&R, 2013), and
 the English translation of Geerhardus Vos, Reformed Dogmatics, 5 vols., edited by Richard B. Gaffin Jr. (Lexham, 2014-2016).

He has also written many academic articles such as:
 "Paul as Theologian," Westminster Theological Journal, May 1968
 "The Usefulness of the Cross," Westminster Theological Journal, Spring 1979
 "The Holy Spirit," Westminster Theological Journal, Fall 1980
 "Old Amsterdam and Inerrancy?" Westminster Theological Journal, Fall 1982 and Fall 1983
 "The Holy Spirit and Eschatology," Kerux: The Journal of Northwest Theological Seminary, December 1989
 "Some Epistemological Reflections on 1 Corinthians 2:6-16," Westminster Theological Journal, Spring 1995
 "Pentecost: Before and After," Kerux: The Journal of Northwest Theological Seminary, September 1995
 "Paul the Theologian," Westminster Theological Journal, Spring 2000.

References

Faculty biography at Westminster Theological Seminary

Calvin University alumni
American Calvinist and Reformed theologians
Living people
Orthodox Presbyterian Church ministers
Westminster Theological Seminary alumni
Westminster Theological Seminary faculty
20th-century American writers
21st-century American non-fiction writers
20th-century Calvinist and Reformed theologians
21st-century Calvinist and Reformed theologians
University of Göttingen alumni
Year of birth missing (living people)